St John's Church Malone is an Anglican church in Malone Road, Belfast, Northern Ireland. It is in the Diocese of Connor. 
This is a Victorian church built in Gothic style. Its Irish stained glass windows are considered to be worth a visit. It was built 1893 - 1895, the nave was built in 1905.

References

External links

Churches completed in 1895
Anglican church buildings
Churches in Belfast
19th-century churches in Northern Ireland